The Olympic Cereal Mill, formerly known as B&O Warehouse, is a building complex in southeast Portland, Oregon, listed on the National Register of Historic Places. The building is currently a creative space.

In 2004, the building was purchased by Beam Development and was then recycled into the building it is today and placed on the National Register of Historic Places.

Tenants
The building has about one hundred tenants, which consist of startups in addition to well-established businesses.
aboutus.org
The Art of Personal Training by Kisar Dhillon
Arthouse Talent & Literary
Classic Body Restoration
Empire Laboratories
Energy 350
Evolve Collaborative
F&M Marketing
GRAYBOX
Grady Britton
Little Green Pickle
McKenna Ryan
Mr. French's Coffee Kitchen
Olympia Provisions
Red Slate Wine Company
Vida Design

See also
 National Register of Historic Places listings in Southeast Portland, Oregon

References

Further reading

External links
 

1906 establishments in Oregon
Buckman, Portland, Oregon
Industrial buildings and structures on the National Register of Historic Places in Portland, Oregon
Industrial buildings completed in 1920
Portland Eastside MPS
Portland Historic Landmarks